Georges Charles Jourdan (born 2 March 1872, date of death unknown) was a French fencer. He competed in the individual épée masters event at the 1900 Summer Olympics, finishing 8th.

References

External links
 

1872 births
Year of death missing
French male épée fencers
Olympic fencers of France
Fencers at the 1900 Summer Olympics
Place of death missing
Sportspeople from Mayenne